Air Panama is a regional airline based at Albrook "Marcos A. Gelabert" International Airport in Panama, and is currently the second-largest air carrier in the country, surpassed only by Copa Airlines. The carrier offers both scheduled and charter passenger flights to more than 31 destinations from its hub at Albrook International Airport.

History

Inauguration

The airline was founded in 1980 as PARSA, though certain services were operated as Turismo Aéreo. At the time of its startup, Panama had been ruled by a military dictatorship government since 1968, but together with Aeroperlas, the company became one of the biggest and most prominent airlines in the country. On 20 December 1989, in the wake of the United States invasion of Panama, two Britten-Norman Islander aircraft owned by PARSA were damaged beyond repair in fighting action. Despite this, the airline expanded rapidly to other destinations around Panama and Costa Rica during the 1990s, and began to acquire newer aircraft.

On New Year's Eve 1997, PARSA suffered its first fatal accident when a Britten-Norman Islander crashed into the jungle 6.5 kilometres short of Rio Sidra Airport, Darien, killing all on board.

In January 1999, the airline moved its headquarters to the new Albrook - Marcos A. Gelabert International Airport, when the old airport located at Paitilla was shut down after 70 years of operation. In 2005, the Air Panama trademark rights were acquired. The name had been unused since the demise of Air Panamá Internacional in January 1990, and PARSA formally adopted the new name that year.

Expansion years

After the purchase of the trademark rights in 2005, Chairman George Novey unveiled on a Fokker F-27 aircraft PARSA's new identity Air Panama. Shortly afterward, the airline introduced new scheduled services to other regional destinations around Panama and began to acquire turboprop aircraft such as the Saab 340 and the Bombardier Dash 8-300 series, replacing the aging British Aerospace Jetstream 31 and Fokker F27 Friendship fleet.

In 2009, Air Panama reached a historic milestone when it transported its one millionth passenger. That same year, the airline entered the jet age
when it acquired two Fokker 70s. In 2011, Air Panama bought two used Fokker 50s previously owned by Scandinavian Airlines System and transported around 172,154 people.
In January 2012, Air Panama announced a codeshare agreement with Copa Airlines, Panama's flag carrier and largest airline, linking all tourist destinations within Panama with several in Latin America. The agreement became effective five months later when the company started charter regional flights to Isla Colon from Tocumen International Airport. As of 2016, this codeshare is no longer active.

On 29 February 2012, domestic competitor Aeroperlas Regional ceased operations due to financial troubles, leaving Air Panama as the sole regional carrier in the country. The same month, the airline expressed an interest in initiating a non-stop international route from Panama to the Cayman Islands, using jet-powered aircraft. In anticipation for these flights, Air Panama ordered two Fokker 100 aircraft, receiving the first one in June and the second two months later. As of February 2015, the planned service to Cayman Islands is on standstill. Almost six months after Aeroperlas' bankruptcy, Air Panama assumed all of its domestic routes.

In November 2012, Air Panama launched an updated version of its website (www.airpanama.com), with a new operational system that allowed travelers to purchase tickets in real time, and to see flight schedules and status. It was the first time the airline extensively overhauled its website since its official rebranding in 2006.

In 2013, Air Panama sold the two Fokker 70s in favour of more spacious Fokker 100s. Between August and November of the same year, the airline acquired two Boeing 737-300s as part of a strategic expansion plan into the international market, which started with the launch of scheduled commercial services to Medellín, Colombia, in June 2014.

In 2015, the airline added three more Fokker 100 aircraft. In July 2015 the airline began daily non-stop flights from Panama to San José, Costa Rica. Services to Costa Rica from David, Chiriqui are still maintained. On December 1, of the same year, Air Panama started services to Armenia, its second destination in Colombia.

Destinations

Air Panama offers scheduled regional flights to 28 destinations inside Panama, and one in Costa Rica.. Further destinations are served on a chartered on-demand basis during the summer travelling season.

Fleet

Current fleet

The Air Panama fleet consists of the following aircraft (as of November 2020):

Former fleet
Air Panama previously operated the following aircraft:

BAe 146-200
BAe Jetstream 32
Boeing 737-300BDQC
Boeing 737-300QC
Bombardier Dash 8 Q300
Britten-Norman Islander
CASA C-212 Aviocar
Cessna 182 Skylane
Cessna 206
de Havilland Canada DHC-6 Twin Otter
Fokker F27 Friendship
Fokker 70
Fokker 100
Saab 340B

Accidents and incidents
During its history, Air Panama (PARSA) had the following incidents and accidents:

See also
List of airlines of Panama

References

External links

 

Airlines of Panama
Airlines established in 1980
Panamanian brands
1980 establishments in Panama
Companies based in Panama City